The 1980–81 BYU Cougars men's basketball team represented Brigham Young University in the 1980–81 college basketball season. This was head coach Frank Arnold's sixth season at BYU. The Cougars played their home games at the Marriott Center and reached the Elite Eight, where they fell to Virginia.

Personnel

Schedule

|-
!colspan=9 style=| Regular season

|-
!colspan=9 style=| NCAA Tournament

Rankings

Season summary

Awards and honors
Danny Ainge – WAC Player of the Year

NBA Draft

References

BYU Cougars men's basketball seasons
Byu
Byu
1980 in sports in Utah
1981 in sports in Utah